Gerry Haywood (4 May 1946 – 12 September 2016) was an English professional darts player who competed in the 1970s and 1980s.

He competed in the 1984 BDO World Darts Championship, defeating the Welsh player Owen Thomas 2–0 in the first round, but was defeated 4–0 in the second round by American Nicky Virachkul. Haywood also played in the 1984 Winmau World Masters but lost in the first round to Bob Anderson. His greatest run came in the 1983 British Professional, beating Keith Deller and Dai Furnish to reach the quarter finals, before losing to Eric Bristow.

Haywood died in September 2016.

References

External links
Profile and stats on Darts Database

1946 births
2016 deaths
British Darts Organisation players
English darts players
Sportspeople from Sheffield